The Canadian province of Ontario has an extensive network of Primary (King's), Secondary, and Tertiary Highways, with county-level and city-level roads linking between them. Over the years, however, Ontario has turned back numerous highways to municipal government bodies, renumbered them, or upgraded them to 400-series highways.

In 1997 and 1998, many sections of the provincial highway network were downloaded to local municipalities (such as cities, counties or regional municipalities) by the Ontario Ministry of Transportation as a cost-saving measure. While highways were occasionally transferred to local governments in the past, the 1997–1998 downloads represented the most significant changes to Ontario's highway network. Many highways were completely devolved, while of others only short sections remain under provincial jurisdiction (Highway 2, once stretching across Southern Ontario, now is only a few kilometres long). Below is a partial list of partially or wholly devolved highways since 1997.

King's highways

 – Windsor to the Ontario-Quebec boundary, now Lake Shore Boulevard, Kingston Road, Toronto Road, and Loyalist Road. Its purpose was largely superseded by Highway 401 and 403; only a 1.1-kilometre section near Gananoque remains.

Scarborough, Ontario – Was once an expressway in the 1940s until Highway 401 took over most of its current route in 1952.
Windsor – Tilbury – Designated in 1929, renumbered to Highway 98 in 1938.
London, Ontario – Paralleled Highway 2 through the downtown core of London. It was established in 1956 and decommissioned in 1968.
Cornwall, Ontario – Bypassed the Seaway International Bridge. It was established in 1965 and decommissioned on 1967.
 – Formerly Ontario Highway 2A in Chatham, Ontario from 1961 to 1970; decommissioned and route reverted to local street names (Richmond Street, Queen Street, School Street, 5th Street and Thames Street)

 – between St. Thomas and Leamington and within the urban areas of Port Colborne and Fort Erie.

 – Downgraded portions: south of the interchange with Highway 401, and north/east of Highway 8

 – Downgraded all of the Paris-Scarborough route except one 12.7 km section between Ontario Highway 8 and Ontario Highway 6

 – Downgraded portions: south/west of Port Dover
 – Downgraded the portion in York Region west of Donald Cousens Parkway / York Regional Road 48.

 – From Winona to Niagara Falls, and, more recently, from Peters Corners to Winona.

 – Split into two segments in Orangeville area and eastern end cut past Highway 400 towards Newmarket due to downgrading of various portions.
 – Hurontario Street in Mississauga and Main Street in Brampton were formerly part of this route, but lost the designation with the completion of Highway 410 through the area. The Highway 10 designation is still in use north of Brampton.
 – from Barrie southward; Now known as Yonge Street, York County Road 1, and Simcoe County Road 4.
 – Toronto; Gardiner Expressway/Lake Shore Boulevard to Highway 401. Now known only as York Street,  University Avenue, Avenue Road, and Oriole Parkway.
 – Cobalt-New Liskeard.  Portions of the road in Coleman Township are still signed as 11B.
 – Whitby—south of Highway 407 right-of-way.

 – Marmora to Highway 62 near Foxboro, the 14 numbering originally continued south (on what is now Highway 62) to Picton. Only one of the *15 Ontario highways (2–17 with 13 skipped) to be completely dropped from the system.
 – From CFB Kingston to Highway 401, now Kingston Road 15, and from Carleton Place to Arnprior, now Lanark County Road 29 and Ottawa Road 29.

 – Upgraded to a 400 series highway (Highway 416). Only exists as a short connector highway between Highway 416 north of Highway 401 and Leeds & Grenville County Road 2 (formerly Highway 2). The section north of North Gower, which is different from the original route, is designated Ottawa Road 73 (Prince of Wales Drive).
 – Replaced by Highway 417 south and east of Arnprior to the Ontario/Quebec border.

 – From Windsor to Leamington, now Essex County Road 20
 – From terminus at Port Burwell to Highway 3 in Tillsonburg; from Highway 401 to terminus at Highway 86 near Milverton. The section from Tillsonburg to Highway 401 remains.
 – From QEW exit 88 east of Hamilton to Highway 58 near Allanburg and from Thorold Townline Road to Niagara Falls, now Regional Road 20 (Confederation Parkway through Stoney Creek, Rymal Road, and Lundy's Lane); only a 1.9-kilometre section near Allanburg remains.
 – Portions South of Highway 402
 – London, Ontario to near Warwick, Ontario, connecting to Sarnia, Ontario and to Arkona by Highway 7; replaced by most of routing of Highway 402
 – 2 km south of Cambridge and northward through Guelph, Orangeville, Shelburne, and Collingwood on Georgian Bay.

 – Now Bronte Road (south of Ontario Highway 407 in Oakville), Ontario St/Steeles Av/Martin St/Halton Regional Rd 25 in Milton, Halton Regional Rd 25 in Halton Hills, and Main Street in Acton.  Continues in segments through Wellington & Dufferin Counties to north of Grand Valley at Highway 89.
 – Etobicoke to Midhurst; now referred to as Highway 27 in Toronto, York Regional Road 27 in Vaughan, and Simcoe County Road 27 in Simcoe County
 – Port Hope to Highway 7A, (which had a concurrency with Highway 115 for 13 km to the Parkway exit), up to NE of Lakefield, at Highway 134.
 – Brockville to Arnprior. The section from Smiths Falls to Carleton Place is now Highway 15; the rest was demoted as County Road 29.
 – Brighton to Havelock
 – Morrisburg to Ottawa
 – Gananoque to Highway 15, near Seeleys Bay; now referred to as Leeds and Grenville County Road 32
 – Trenton to Picton; the portion east of Collins Bay Road in Kingston, Ontario was also removed from the provincial system
 – Lancaster to Hawkesbury

 – Lindsay to Highway 28 at Burleigh Falls. Now referred to as Kawartha Lakes Road 36.
 – Kingston to Highway 7 near Sharbot Lake; now referred to as Kingston, South Frontenac and Central Frontenac Road 38
 – Windsor to south of Belle River. (1934–1970. Now Essex County Road 22 from Essex County Road 42 to Essex County Road 2, and Essex County Road 2 into Windsor. Rendered obsolete with the completion of E.C. Row Expressway in 1970, and was absorbed into Highway 2.

 – Portion between Highway 2 and Highway 7 downgraded as Lennox and Addington County Road 41.
 – Entirely downgraded, Westport to Forthton.
 – Entirely downgraded. Perth to Alexandria, via Smiths Falls, and Winchester deleted in 1998—Perth to Smith Falls section had been part of Ontario Highway 15 prior to renumbering of the Perth-Carleton Place-Kanata portion of 15's route as Highway 7 in 1961.
 – Between Lanark County Road 29 (formerly ) in Almonte, Ontario and Donald B. Munro Drive (formerly ) west of Carp, Ontario (1938–1997). Now Ottawa Road 49 (March Road).
Now known as Northumberland County Road 45 and Peterborough County Road 45.
 – Between  and Kawartha Lakes Road 48 (formerly ) near Bolsover.  Now Kawartha Lakes Road 46.
 – Highway 48 north of Stouffville to Highways 7 & 12 south of Greenbank.
 – Between Kingston Road and York Regional Road 73.

 – Between Picton and the Quinte Skyway Bridge.
 – Toronto section; also referred to as Albion Road to Highway 89 west of Alliston.
 – North of Cataract to Caledon.
 – East of Alberton to Highway 8 at Peters Corners.
 – Stoney Creek to Eastwood.

 – Now Niagara Regional Road 55.
 – Highway 3 west of Canfield to Stoney Creek.
 – From Highway 58A in Welland to Highway 406 between Turner's Corners and Allanburg.
 – Transferred in its entirety to the counties of Norfolk, Oxford and Perth.
 – became Highway 6 on Manitoulin Island.
 – replaced by Highway 400 south of MacTier. Highway's length continues to shrink with extension of Highway 400 to Sudbury, and the number will disappear entirely by 2021.
 – renamed Highway 6 from Hepworth to Springmount.
 – Port Bruce to Dorchester
 – New Sarum to Nilestown. Deleted in 1997.

 – Highway 27 junction at Bond Head to Highway 11 junction in Bradford.  Existed from 1938 to 1998. Renamed as Simcoe County Road 88.
 – Eastern end truncated at Ontario Highway 400 (original terminus was Ontario Highway 11)
 – Barrie to Angus and CFB Borden.
 – South of Highway 400 interchange
 – Wolfe Island
 – Wolfe Island
 – Freelton to Hickson, through Galt/Cambridge.
 Highway 98 –  Essex County 1938–1970. It was deleted, becoming Essex County Road 46, and Kent County (now Chatham-Kent) Road 8. Its western terminus was downtown Windsor, and its eastern terminus was downtown Blenheim, at Highways 40 and 3. Rendered obsolete with the completion of nearby freeway, Highway 401 (which paralleled Highway 98 for the majority of its length).
 – Governor's Road (original alignment of Dundas Street from Highway 24 North of Brantford to Ancaster
 – MCF (ON-401) at exit 194 to Former ON-2, eastern part of London, now Veterans Memorial Parkway.
Highway 103 – Highway 400 and 12 to Highway 69 junction, first the original alignment of Highway 69, now Highway 400.
Highway 104 – to Grand Valley from Highway 9, then Highway 25.
 – Highway 18 in Ruthven, Ontario, to Highway 3 in Ruthven. Now Essex County Road 45.
 – Highway 3 (Former alignment, now Essex County Road 34) in Maidstone, Ontario (now a part of Tecumseh, Ontario, to Highway 98 (Now Essex County Road 46). Part of road is still signed as "Old HWY 114" from Manning Road (Essex County Road 19) to Provincial Road (Essex County Road 46).
 – Highway 11 north of Bracebridge to Dorset.
 – Western end truncated at Ontario Highway 11 (original terminus was Ontario Highway 169)
 – Highway 35 south of Fenelon Falls to Haliburton.  Eastward is renamed Highway 118.
Highway 123 – now Airport Road in North Bay, Ontario.
– MacDonald-Cartier Freeway (Highway 401) in the south end of London, Ontario (partially superhighway—Wenige Expressway) to Highway 2, some think extended to Highway 22 (present Fanshawe Park Road East), now known as Highbury Avenue. (The part between Highway 401 and the south Thames River had no name, while a half-mile section from the Thames to Hamilton Road was the Wenige Expwy, and north from there was Highbury Avenue.)
 – Renamed Simcoe County Road 27.
 Highway 133 – Renamed Lennox and Addington County Road 4.
 – Renamed Highway 28 when that road was re-routed and fully absorbed Highway 134.
 – Short highway in London, between Highway 401 and former Highways 2 & 4. Now called Exeter Road.
 – Cataract to Orangeville. Formerly Highway 24.
 – Highway 17 to Pembroke, Ontario city limits was decommissioned, now just a connecting link (which allows it to still be signed as Highway 148). Continuation of Quebec route 148.
 – Brechin to Foote's Bay via Gravenhurst, shared space with Highway 11 from Washago to Gravenhurst.
 – Highway 427 to Lake Shore Blvd. (former Highway 2). This section is now known as the Gardiner Expressway, which is owned by the City of Toronto.

Secondary highways

 – Between Highway 48 in Kirkfield and Highway 121 in Tory Hill. Now Kawartha Lakes Road 6, Kawartha Lakes Road 45, Peterborough County Road 503 and Haliburton County Road 503.
 – Highway 41 to Plevna. Now known as North Frontenac Road 506. Continues east/south as North Frontenac Road 509.
 – Between Highway 28 in Lakefield and Highway 503 in Gooderham. Now Peterborough County Road 23, Peterborough County Road 36, Peterborough County Road 507 and Haliburton County Road 507.
 – Highway 17 west of Arnprior to Calabogie.  Entirely downloaded to Renfrew County.
 – Highway 7 to Plevna. Now known as Central Frontenac and North Frontenac Road 509. Continues west as North Frontenac Road 506.
 – Perth to Calabogie.  Entirely downloaded to Lanark and Renfrew counties.
 – Used to run from Boulter to Combermere at Highway 62.  Downgraded to county road status in Hastings and Renfrew counties.
 – Passes by the ghost town of Creighton Mine near the town of Lively in Greater Sudbury. Redesignated as Municipal Road 24.
 – Wanup to Wahnapitae in Greater Sudbury. Partially redesignated as Municipal Road 537.
 – New Sudbury, Garson and Skead. Redesignated as Municipal Road 86.
 – Highway 69 to Dew Drop Road in Sudbury.  Downloaded in 1973 upon the creation of the Regional Municipality of Sudbury as Long Lake Road, part of Regional Road 80.  Now designated Greater Sudbury Municipal Road 80.
 – Downtown Sudbury to Cartier. Redesignated as Highway 144 in 1965, as extension to Timmins was under construction.
 – Hanmer, Capreol and Selwood. Redesignated as Municipal Road 84.
 – Whitefish to Lake Panache in the town of Walden; downloaded in mid-1980s and now designated as Greater Sudbury Municipal Road 10.
Boulter Road was an un-numbered secondary highway from at least the 1930s. It was downloaded in 1998, with its more-well-known brother road, Highway 517.
 – Sault Ste. Marie business route linking Highway 550 with the Sault Ste. Marie International Bridge. Returned to original city street names when Ontario decommissioned most B-series highways.
 – Peterborough County route linking Highway 28 to Highway 62, entirely downloaded in 1997 to Peterborough and Hastings County
 – Chelmsford  to Val Caron. Redesignated as Regional Road 15 by the Regional Municipality of Sudbury in the early 1970s and is now designated Municipal Road 15 in present-day Greater Sudbury. A different unrelated Highway 634 is now located in Smooth Rock Falls, which was the former Highway 807.
 – Rolphton to Rapides-des-Joachims, Quebec. Interprovincial crossing downloaded to Renfrew County.
 – Linking Highway 599 with sites in the township of Pickle Lake. Now identified on signage as Pickle Lake Road.
 – Chenaux Road. Interprovincial crossing to Portage-du-Fort, Quebec; downloaded to Renfrew County.
 – Victoria Mine (ghost town) near Worthington. Redesignated as Municipal Road 4. Number was later revived on a different highway near Kenora.

Tertiary roads
 Highway 800 - Not currently assigned. Became Highway 527 in 1976.
 Highway 801 - Highway 11 to Namewaminikan River
 Highway 803 - Not currently assigned. Became Highway 101 to Nighthawk Lake in 1997.
 Highway 806 - Not currently assigned. Became Highway 545 in 1973.
 Highway 807 – Fraserdale to Highway 11 at Smooth Rock Falls. Redesignated as Highway 634 in 1977. See Highway 634, an unrelated highway known today as municipal road 15 located in Greater Sudbury.
 Highway 807 - Not currently assigned. Became Highway 622 in 1989.
 Highway 808 - Not currently assigned. From Highway 599 in Central Patricia to Otoskwin River Bridge. Previously an extension of Highway 599. Decommissioned in 1983.
 Highway 809 - Decommissioned road near Boston Creek
 Highway 812 - Not currently assigned. Became Highway 502 in 1981.
 Highway 813 - Decommissioned road near Sturgeon Falls (identified as Riding Stable Road)

Recycling
Highway numbers have even been "recycled" (used more than once on a provincial highway), however the use tends to be as far as possible from the original routing, and generally a few decades' time separate each numbering, to minimize confusion.

King's Highways
 Ontario Highway 77
 Ontario Highway 102 – Was originally assigned to Canada's first divided highway, now known as Cootes Drive.  It bypassed western Hamilton, from McMaster University to Dundas.  Now assigned to the Dawson Road bypass of Thunder Bay.
 Ontario Highway 109 – Formerly Eglinton Avenue East, Scarborough. Reassigned to a highway in Cardiff, Ontario which has now been renumbered.

Secondary highways
 Ontario Highway 502 – Formerly the Belleville Road between Marysville, Hastings County, Ontario and Napanee, bypassing the Ontario Highway 2 segment through Deseronto, Ontario. Reassigned and currently in use in Northern Ontario.

References

External links
History and Route Maps of Ontario Highways – The History of Ontario's Kings Highways

 
Provincial Highways, former